Petr Svoboda (born June 20, 1980) is a Czech former professional ice hockey defenceman. He was drafted in the second round, 35th overall, by the Toronto Maple Leafs in the 1998 NHL Entry Draft. His previous clubs where Dukla Jihlava and HC Oceláři Třinec. He played eighteen games in the National Hockey League with the Maple Leafs in the 2000–01 season.

Career statistics

Regular season and playoffs

International

External links 
 

1980 births
Living people
BK Havlíčkův Brod players
Czech expatriate ice hockey players in Canada
Czech ice hockey defencemen
HC Dukla Jihlava players
HC Oceláři Třinec players
Sportspeople from Jihlava
St. John's Maple Leafs players
Toronto Maple Leafs draft picks
Toronto Maple Leafs players